Rafael Irizarry may refer to:
 Rafael Irizarry (politician), a Puerto Rican politician who served as a member of the Senate of Puerto Rico from 2001 to 2005.
 Rafael Irizarry (scientist), professor of biostatistics and one of the founders of the Bioconductor project.